Elyse White is an English professor at Stony Brook University, and author of You Talkin' to Me?: The Unruly History of New York English.

White is a Fellow of the Society for the Humanities.

During an interview on WSHU about her 2020 book You Talkin' To Me?: The Unruly History of New York English White confessed that when she first arrived at a New York City airport, to take up her new position at a New York City University, she was surprised to hear a New York City accent.  She said she thought the accent was an invention of television writers.

In its review The New York Post noted that White wrote that the New York accent was once considered a mark of distinction.  She attributed the decline of the accent's prestige to anti-semitism.

In its review The Economist quotes White explaining that New Yorkers regard what outsiders see as aggressiveness as merely a flattering sign of engagement and interest.

In its review The Wall Street Journal quoted White's comments of the influence the New York accent had on the lyrics of the popular songs or Ira Gershwin and Cole Porter.

Publications

References

Living people
Stony Brook University faculty
Year of birth missing (living people)